The following is a list of notable former pupils, known as Old Paulines, of St Paul's School (London). The abbreviation OP is sometimes used.

16th century
John Leland (c.1503–1555); antiquary 
George Lily (died 1559); Catholic priest, biographer and topographer
Peter Carew (1514–1575); adventurer
Thomas Gresham (1519–1579); founder of the Royal Exchange
William Harrison (1534–1593); clergyman and author of The Description of England
William Camden (1551–1623); antiquary

17th century
John Milton (1608–1674); poet
Samuel Pepys (1633–1703); civil servant and diarist
James Hayes (1637–1694); Prince Rupert's secretary and first Deputy Governor, Hudson's Bay Company.
George Jeffreys (1645–1689); Lord Chief Justice
Samuel Johnson (pamphleteer) (1649–1703) English political writer
John Churchill (1650–1722); army officer and 1st Duke of Marlborough
Edmond Halley (1656–1742); astronomer, geophysicist, meteorologist and physicist
Spencer Compton (1674–1743); Earl of Wilmington and Prime Minister of Great Britain
Roger Cotes (1682–1716); mathematician

18th century
Joshua Toulmin (1740–1815); Dissenting minister
George Dance the Younger (1741–1825); architect
John André (1750–1780); army officer and spy
Thomas Taylor (1758–1835); scholar and translator
Thomas Clarkson (1760–1846); anti-slavery campaigner
Daniel Alexander (1768–1846); architect

19th century
Richard Ryan (1797–1849); biographer, poet and playwright
Joseph Blakesley (1808–1885); clergyman
Benjamin Jowett (1817–1893); Master of Balliol College, Oxford
Henry Baden-Powell KC (1847–1921); older brother of Robert Baden-Powell, founder of Sea Scouts, angler and notable canoe author & designer
Ray Lankester (1847–1929); zoologist
Cecil Clementi Smith (1849–1916); colonial administrator
Bertrand Dawson, 1st Viscount Dawson of Penn (1864–1945); Royal physician
Sidney Alexander (1866–1948); Newdigate Prize Winner and Canon, St. Paul's
Gilbert Walker (1868–1958); Physicist and Statistician
Charles Beazley (1868–1955); Historian and academic
Laurence Binyon (1869–1943); poet
Sidney Barton (1876–1946); diplomat
Sir Walter Willson (1876–1952), member of the Legislative Assembly of India.
William Martin Geldart (1870–1922); jurist
Aurobindo Ghose (1872–1950); Indian mystic, philosopher, poet, yogi and guru
G. K. Chesterton (1874–1936); writer
Edmund Clerihew Bentley (1875–1956); journalist and poet
Leslie Mathews (1875–1946); cricketer and educator
Edward Thomas (1878–1917); poet
Ernest Shepard (1879–1976); illustrator of Winnie the Pooh and The Wind in the Willows
James Garnett (1880–1958); educationist, barrister, and peace campaigner
Leonard Woolf (1880–1969); civil servant and political theorist
Edward Ayrton (1882–1914); Egyptologist and archaeologist
Compton Mackenzie (1883–1972); writer
Otto Niemeyer (1883–1971), director at the Bank of England
John Littlewood (1885–1977); mathematician
Philip Clayton (1885–1972), founder of Toc H
Duncan Grant (1885–1978), Bloomsbury painter
Valentine Vivian (1886–1969); vice-chief of SIS; head of counter-espionage
George Watson (1886–1965); mathematician
Bernard Law Montgomery (1887–1976), World War II General and Field Marshall
Archibald Low, (1888–1956); scientist and inventor
G. D. H. Cole (1889–1959), political philosopher
Leonard Hodgson (1889–1969), theologian
Paul Nash (1889–1946); artist
Isaac Rosenberg, (1890–1918); poet
Roualeyn Cumming (1891–1981); cricketer and colonial police officer
John Armstrong (1893–1973); artist
Victor Gollancz (1893–1967); publisher
Baron Hannen ; judge
Ewart Alan Mackintosh MC (1893–1917), war poet and an officer in the Seaforth Highlanders
Henry Daniell (1894–1963); actor
Leonard Barnes (1895–1977); anticolonialist writer and educationalist
B. H. Liddell Hart (1895–1970); military strategist
George Catlin (1896–1979); political scientist and philosopher
Indra Lal Roy (1898–1918); World War I fighter ace
Paul Shuffrey (1889-1955); colonial administrator, editor and publisher

20th century
Hugh Schonfield (1901–1988); biblical scholar, critic of St Paul
Desmond Nethersole-Thompson (1908–1989); renowned British ornithologist, naturalist and author 
Magnus Pyke (1908–1992); author, scientist
Isaiah Berlin (1909–1997); political philosopher and historian of ideas
Max Beloff (1913–1999); historian
George Ignatieff (1913–1989); Permanent Representative of Canada to the United Nations
Frederick Valentine Atkinson (1916–2002); mathematician.
Eric Newby (1919–2006); writer
John Russell (1919–2008); chief art critic, NY Times
Leonard Berney (1920–2016); Bergen-Belsen concentration camp liberator
John Chadwick (1920–1998); linguist, assisted Michael Ventris in the 1953 decipherment of Linear B.
Norman Mischler (1920–2009); cricketer
Dennis Brain (1921–1957); horn player
Lister Sinclair (1921–2006); writer, actor, playwright and presenter with the Canadian Broadcasting Corporation
Anthony Hinds (1922–2013); film producer and scriptwriter, known for Hammer Films
Ian Allan, OBE (1922–2015); book publisher and railwayman
Sir Ninian Stephen (1923–2017); Governor-General of Australia, Justice of the High Court of Australia
Donald Nicol (1923–2003); byzantinist
Nicholas Parsons (1923–2020); actor and television presenter
Peter Hilton (1923–2010); mathematician
Clement Freud (1924–2009); writer, broadcaster and politician
James Moorhouse (1924–2014); politician
Pete Murray (DJ) (born 1925); broadcaster and disc jockey
Klaus Roth (1925–2015); mathematician, Fields medallist
Patrick David Wall (1925–2001); neuroscientist
John Thorn (born 1925); headmaster of Repton and Winchester, chairman of the Headmasters' Conference for 1981
Anthony Shaffer (1926–2001); author, playwright
Richard Wilson (1926–2018); physicist
Peter Shaffer (1926–2016); author, playwright
Alexis Korner (1928–1984); blues musician
Ioan James (born 1928); mathematician
Greville Janner (1928–2015), politician (Labour)
John Dunwoody (1929–2006); politician (Labour)
Stanley Sadie (1930–2005); musicologist, editor of the New Grove Dictionary of Music and Musicians
Chris Barber (1930–2021); trombonist, jazz band leader
Antony Jay (1930–2016); writer of Yes Minister, broadcaster
Graeme MacDonald (1930–1997); television producer and executive
Brian Widlake (1931–2017); presenter of The World at One and PM (BBC Radio 4) and The Money Programme (BBC Two)
Oliver Sacks (1933–2015); neurologist, author
Julian Bream (1933–2020); classical guitarist
Kenneth Baker (born 1934); politician (Conservative)
Jonathan Miller (1934–2019); theatre and opera director
Basil Moss (1935–2020); television and radio actor
Bob Jeffery (1935–2016), Dean Emeritus of Worcester
Richard Gombrich (born 1937), professor of Sanskrit
Benjamin Zander (born 1939); conductor
Robert Winston (born 1940); biologist and television presenter
Nicolas Belfrage MW (1940–2022), Master of Wine
Neil Trevor Kaplan, (born 1942) High Court judge, Hong Kong
Chris Green (born 1943); railway manager
John Gilbert (born 1943), television writer, director and producer
Rooney Massara (born 1943); Olympian
Tim Razzall (born 1943), politician (Liberal Democrat) and solicitor
John Simpson (born 1944); journalist
Serge Lourie (born 1946); local politician and Leader of London Borough of Richmond upon Thames (Liberal Democrat)
Paul Cartledge (born 1947); Levantis Professor of Greek Culture, Cambridge University
Duncan Fallowell (born 1948); author
David Abulafia (born 1949); historian
Jon Blair (born 1950); television & film writer, director and producer
Tim Hunkin (born 1950); inventor 
Lloyd Dorfman (born 1951); billionaire, philanthropist
Terence Etherton (born 1951); Master of the Rolls
Tim Fywell (born 1951), television and film director
Philip Hardie (born 1951), professor and specialist in Latin literature, Cambridge University
Duncan Haldane (born 1951), 2016 Nobel Prize in Physics laureate
Richard Davenport-Hines (born 1953); historian, writer
Roly Bain (1954–2016), clown-priest
David Bean (born 1954), judge
 Nicholas Kroll (born 1954)  civil servant
Rob Manzoli (born 1954); musician, lead guitarist Right Said Fred
Glen Oglaza (born 1955); political correspondent of Sky News
Tom Hayhoe (born 1956); director of healthcare organisations, offshore racing sailor
David Shilling (born 1956); hat designer
Luke Hughes (born 1957); furniture designer
Simon Fraser (born 1958) ; Diplomat, Permanent Under-Secretary of State for Foreign Affairs July 2010 – July 2015
Francis Wright (born 1958); actor and puppeteer
Maxwell Caulfield (born 1959); actor
Iain Gale (born 1959); journalist and author
Euclid Tsakalotos (born 1960); Greek economist and politician, former Greek Minister of Finance
Simon Milton (1961–2011); politician (Conservative)
David Levin (born 1962); businessman, CEO of McGraw-Hill Education
Ian Livingstone (born 1962); chairman and co-owner, London & Regional Properties
Ben Watt (born 1962); musician
Imre Leader (born 1963); mathematician, Othello player
Peter Morgan (born 1963); screenwriter.
James Reed (born 1963); chairman, Reed Group
William Goodchild (born 1964); composer and orchestrator
James Kennard (born 1964); rabbi and educationalist
Patrick Marber (born 1964); playwright
Jonathan Foreman (born 1965); journalist
Stephen B. Streater (born 1965); entrepreneur, founder of Eidos
Stephen Greenhalgh (born 1967); Deputy Mayor for Policing and Crime in London since June 2012
Robert Asch (born 1968); journalist and author; co-editor of St Austin Review
Ed Vaizey (born 1968); M.P. (Conservative) May 2005 – November 2019
Neil Jones; Director of Studies in Law at Magdalene College, Cambridge
Hal Cruttenden (born 1969); actor and comedian
Dominic Frisby (born 1969); author, actor and comedian
James Harding (born 1969); editor of The Times newspaper (Dec 2007–2012)
Nick Quested (born 1969); filmmaker
Alan Cox (born 1970); actor
Jonny Dymond (born 1970); BBC correspondent and radio presenter
James Hyman (born 1970); presenter
James Max (born 1970); broadcaster, journalist
Alex Chesterman (born 1970); entrepreneur
George Osborne (born 1971); M.P. (Conservative) June 2001, Chancellor of the Exchequer May 2010 – July 2016
Sam Houser (born 1971); president of Rockstar Games
Patrick Neate (born 1971); novelist
Sam Bain (born 1971); screenwriter; co-creator of Peep Show
Sacha Tarter (born 1972); actor and screenwriter
Theo Hobson (born 1972); theorist
Jamie Bamber (born 1973); actor
Tom Tugendhat (born 1973); M.P. (Conservative) May 2015 – present
Dan Houser (born 1974); vice-president of Rockstar Games
Simon Dennis (born 1976); rower and Olympic gold medalist
Rory Kinnear (born 1978); actor
Dan Snow (born 1978); journalist & television presenter
Robin Walker (born 1978); M.P. (Conservative) May 2010 – present
Blake Ritson (born 1980); actor
Tim Kash (born 1982); television presenter
Robin Ticciati (born 1983); conductor
Henry Lloyd-Hughes, (born 1985) actor
Charlie Fink (born 1986); musician and member of folk band Noah and the Whale
Winston Marshall (born 1988); musician and member of folk band Mumford & Sons
Mark-Francis Vandelli (born 1989); television personality known for his role in Made in Chelsea
Will Attenborough (born 1991); actor
Sam Cato (born 1992); cricketer
Tom Powe (born 1998); cricketer
Hugo Lowell (born 1999); congressional reporter for Guardian US in Washington DC
Three Old Paulines have been awarded the Victoria Cross.
Captain Randolph Cosby Nesbitt, VC, (1867–1956), British South Africa Police. Later promoted to major during the South African War. Awarded for act that took place during the Mashona Rebellion (Rhodesia) of 1896–1897. (OP 1880–1882)
Major Cuthbert Bromley, VC, (1878–1915) 1st Lancashire Fusiliers. Awarded for act that took place during the First World War. (OP 1890–1895)
Major Oliver Cyril Spencer Watson, VC, DSO, (1876–1918), Yeomanry, attached King's Own Yorkshire Light Infantry. Later promoted to lieutenant-colonel. Awarded for act that took place during the First World War. (OP 1888–95)

References

People educated at St Paul's School, London
Paulines